1-2-3; 1, 2, 3; or One, Two, Three may refer to:

Brands
 1-2-3 (fuel station), in Norway
 Lotus 1-2-3, a computer spreadsheet program
 .123, a file extension used by Lotus 1-2-3
 Jell-O 1-2-3, a dessert

Film, TV and books
 One, Two, Three, a 1961 film by Billy Wilder 
 One Two Three, a 2008 comedy film
 123 (film), a 2002 Tamil romantic comedy
 One, Two, Three and Away!, a set of children's stories by Sheila K. McCullagh

Music
 1,2,3, a band from Pittsburgh later reformed as Animal Scream
 1-2-3, a band from Edinburgh later known as Clouds
 One, Two, Three, a 1980s electronic disco group produced by Bobby Orlando

Albums
 1-2-3 (APO Hiking Society album)
 1-2-3 (Howling Hex album)
 I-II-III (Icon of Coil albums), a set of three albums released in 2006
 Uno Dos Tres 1•2•3, a 1966 album by Willie Bobo

Songs
 "1-2-3" (Len Barry song), 1965
 "1, 2, 3" (Sofía Reyes song), 2018
 "1-2-3" (The Chimes song), 1990
 "1-2-3" (Gloria Estefan and Miami Sound Machine song), 1988
"1, 2, 3!" (Seungri song), 2018
 "1. 2. 3. ...", a 2006 song by Bela B. and Charlotte Roche from the album Bingo
 "123" (Nikki Laoye song), 2012
 "1 2 3" (Moneybagg Yo song), 2020 
 "One, Two, Three" (Ch!pz song), 2005
 "One Two Three / The Matenrō Show", a 2012 song by Morning Musume
 "One, Two, Three, Go!", a 2008 song by Belanova
 "One Two Three", a 2012 song by E-girls
 "1-2-3! (Train with Me)", a song by Playahitty

Other uses
 A 1-2-3 inning, in baseball

See also
 123 (disambiguation)
 1 + 2 + 3 + 4 + ⋯
 Raz, Dwa, Trzy, Polish music band
 Raz, dwa, trzy (newspaper), Polish sports weekly
 "(Un, Dos, Tres) María", a 1995 song by Ricky Martin
 Un, dos, tres... responda otra vez, a Spanish game show